The 1994 Women's Rugby World Cup Final was a rugby union match to decide the winner of the 1994 Women's Rugby World Cup. The match was between 1991 finalists England and the United States, it took place on 24 April. England claimed their first title after beating the United States 38–23 in the Final.

Route to the final 

England was placed in Pool B with Scotland and Russia. The defending champions, USA, were pooled with Japan and Sweden. The United States pool games was a one-sided affair as they annihilated both oppositions with nothing short of a hundred. First, was Sweden with a 111–0 trouncing, then USA beat Japan with an abysmal 121–0.

England's opponents in the Pool games also went scoreless. Russia went down 66–0 while Scotland put up a bit of a fight with the English only scoring 26 points.

Match

Summary 
England had their revenge after they beat the United States 38–23. English captain Karen Almond kicked in 13 points with flanker Gill Burns, centre Jacquie Edwards and full-back Jane Mitchell scoring a try each to help England claim their first World Cup title.

References 

Final
England women's national rugby union team
United States women's national rugby union team
1994 in American rugby union
1993–94 in English rugby union
Women's rugby union matches
1994 in American women's sports
1994 in English women's sport
1994
Rugby World Cup Final